Lane House is a historic home located at Mercersburg in Franklin County, Pennsylvania. It was built in 1828, and is a -story, five-bay, brick dwelling in the Federal-style. It was the birthplace of Harriet Lane (1830-1903), who served as hostess at the White House for her uncle James Buchanan from 1857 to 1861.

It was listed on the National Register of Historic Places in 1972. It is located in the Mercersburg Historic District.

References 

Houses on the National Register of Historic Places in Pennsylvania
Federal architecture in Pennsylvania
Houses completed in 1828
Houses in Franklin County, Pennsylvania
National Register of Historic Places in Franklin County, Pennsylvania
Historic district contributing properties in Pennsylvania